Sanjit "Bunker" Roy (born 30 June 1945) is an Indian social activist and educator who founded the Barefoot College. He was selected as one of Time 100's 100 most influential personalities in 2010 for his work in educating illiterate and semi literate rural Indians. Roy was awarded the Padma Shri by Giani Zail Singh in 1986.

Early life
He attended The Doon School from 1956 to 1962, and St. Stephen's College, Delhi from 1962 to 1967.

He was the Indian National Squash champion in 1965 and also participated in three world squash championships representing India .

Barefoot College
Bunker is a founder of what is now called Barefoot College. After conducting a survey of water supplies in 100 drought-prone areas, Roy established the Social Work and Research Centre in 1972. Its mission soon changed from a focus on water and irrigation to empowerment and sustainability. The programs focused on siting water pumps near villages and training the local population to maintain them without dependence on outside mechanics, providing training as paramedics for local medical treatment, and on solar power to decrease dependence and time spent on kerosene lighting.

He was recognized in 2010 in Time for the programs of the college which have trained more than 3 million people in skills including solar engineers, teachers, midwives, weavers, architects, and doctors.

He was married to ex-IAS [Aruna Roy] in 1970.

Other work

Roy was appointed by Rajiv Gandhi to the government's Planning Commission. He recommended that legislation be created that would apply a "code of conduct" for non-governmental organizations. He also proposed that a national council be created that would recommend "legitimate" organizations to the government and monitor their activities. Both of these recommendations were "fiercely" opposed as mechanisms that could be used to promote patronage of favored groups and quell organizations that were not supportive of a particular government or party.

In 1983, he was the plaintiff in  Roy v State of Rajasthan in which the Supreme Court struck down an emergency policy which had allowed women famine relief workers to be paid less than male workers.

Roy has spoken at the TED conference, in which he talks about how the Barefoot College "helps rural communities becomes self-sufficient."

Awards and recognition

 1985: "Jamnalal Bajaj Award" for Application of Science and Technology for Rural Development.
 2003: Won The 2003 "St Andrews Prize for the Environment"
 2003: One of 20 people to be selected as "Social Entrepreneurs of the Year" by Schwab Foundation for Social Entrepreneurship
 2009: Received a "Robert Hill Award" for his contribution to promotion of photo-voltaics (solar energy)

References

External links

 Profile
 

1945 births
Living people
Businesspeople from West Bengal
Scholars from Rajasthan
The Doon School alumni
Indian social entrepreneurs
Recipients of the Padma Shri in social work
20th-century Indian businesspeople
20th-century Indian educators
Scholars from West Bengal
People from Asansol
Indian male squash players